Margarinotus obscurus is a species of clown beetle in the family Histeridae. It is found in Africa, Europe and Northern Asia (excluding China), North America, and Southern Asia.

References

Further reading

 
 

Histeridae
Beetles of Africa
Beetles of Asia
Beetles of Europe
Beetles of North America
Beetles described in 1792
Articles created by Qbugbot